Acianthera bohnkiana is a species of orchid.

References

bohnkiana